Lentzea waywayandensis is a bacterium from the genus of Lentzea which has been isolated from soil from the Lake Waywayanda in New Jersey in the United States.

References

Pseudonocardiales
Bacteria described in 1989